Eric Scott Turner (born February 26, 1972) is an American businessman, motivational speaker, politician, and former professional football player, who previously served as the executive director of the White House Opportunity and Revitalization Council. Turner formerly served as a Texas state representative for the 33rd District, which includes part of Collin County and all of Rockwall County. Before entering politics, Turner was an American football cornerback who played in the National Football League (NFL) for nine seasons.

Education and football career
Turner played football at Pearce High School in Richardson, Texas. He then attended the University of Illinois, where he played as their starting cornerback and graduated from with a degree in speech communications. He declared for the NFL Draft in 1995 and was selected by the Washington Redskins in the seventh round. Between 1995 and 2004, Turner played for the Redskins, San Diego Chargers and Denver Broncos. He would be the last Charger to wear #21 before Hall of Famer LaDainian Tomlinson.

Political career
During NFL off-seasons, Turner worked as an intern for Congressman Duncan Hunter. After retiring from football, he accepted a full-time job in the congressman's office. In 2006, he ran for the vacated seat of California's 50th congressional district in the 2006 special election to replace Duke Cunningham. In the blanket primary election held April 11, 2006, Turner finished eighth out of 17 candidates.

After the loss, Turner moved back to Frisco, Texas, where he continued his motivational speaking. In April 2007, he took a job at Systemware, a content management software company, where he is currently director of business development. He also launched a custom men's suit clothing line.

In 2012, Turner announced his candidacy for the newly created 33rd District of the Texas House of Representatives. Turner defeated Jim Pruitt in the Republican primary and defeated Libertarian candidate Michael Carrasco in the November 6 general election. He was sworn in on January 8, 2013. In 2013, he was named by GOPAC to their list of Emerging Leaders in the Republican party.

Turner challenged Joe Straus for role of Speaker of the Texas House of Representatives in January 2015, the first recorded Speaker vote since 1976. Though backed by the Tea Party Caucus, Turner lost to Straus by 127 votes to 19. Turner declined to run for re-election to the Texas Legislature.

In 2019, President Trump appointed Turner as the director of the White House Opportunity and Revitalization Council, created by Executive Order 13853.

Post-political career
At the December 27, 2020 church service for Prestonwood Baptist Church (where Turner and his family are members), it was announced that Turner will be joining the pastoral staff upon the transition from the Trump to the Biden Administration.

References

External links
 2006 campaign website
House profile
 

1972 births
21st-century American politicians
African-American state legislators in Texas
American athlete-politicians
American football cornerbacks
American male sprinters
Denver Broncos players
Illinois Fighting Illini football players
Living people
Republican Party members of the Texas House of Representatives
People from Richardson, Texas
Players of American football from Texas
San Diego Chargers players
Sportspeople from the Dallas–Fort Worth metroplex
Trump administration personnel
Washington Redskins players